Anna-Stina Wahlberg (17 August 1931 – 17 February 2020) was a Swedish diver. She competed at the 1952 Summer Olympics and the 1956 Summer Olympics.

References

External links
 

1931 births
2020 deaths
Swedish female divers
Olympic divers of Sweden
Divers at the 1952 Summer Olympics
Divers at the 1956 Summer Olympics
Divers from Stockholm